Rehoboth Urban East is an electoral constituency in the Hardap region of Namibia, comprising the suburbs of Rehoboth that are situated to the east of the national road B1. It had a population of 18,035 in 2011, up from 12,891 in 2001.  the constituency had 12,112 registered voters.

Politics
The 2015 regional elections were won by Edward Alfred Wambo of SWAPO with 3,250 votes. Frans Josef Bertolini of the United People's Movement (UPM) came second with 1,090 votes, followed by Marius ǃKharigub of the Rally for Democracy and Progress (RDP, 393 votes) and Johannes Lukas de Klerk of the Democratic Turnhalle Alliance (DTA, 227 votes). Wambo was narrowly reelected in the 2020 regional election and is now the only SWAPO councillor in Hardap Region. He obtained 1,829 votes. Bartholomeus Pieters of the Landless People's Movement (LPM, a new party registered in 2018) came second with 1,756 votes.

References 

Constituencies of Hardap Region
Rehoboth, Namibia
States and territories established in 1992
1992 establishments in Namibia